Zenhouse is the fourth collaborative live album by bassist Jonas Hellborg and guitarist Shawn Lane, released on 9 November 1999 through Bardo Records. For this line-up, they are joined for the third time by drummer Jeff Sipe. In contrast to the previous high-energy jazz fusion/rock releases by the trio, this album is performed unplugged.

Critical reception

Michael G. Nastos of AllMusic gave Zenhouse four stars of five, describing the music as "displaying a characteristic effortless flow, patience, and virtue closely associated with the music of Ravi Shankar, Oregon, or Shakti", whilst suggesting to casual listeners that "those expecting and wanting only the rock loudness these three have displayed before, however, will be disappointed."

Track listing

Personnel
Jonas Hellborg – bass, production
Shawn Lane – scat singing, guitar
Jeff Sipe – snare drum, bongo drum, cymbals, bells

References

External links
In Review: Hellborg/Lane  "Zen House" at Guitar Nine Records

Jonas Hellborg albums
Shawn Lane albums
1999 live albums
Collaborative albums